Francesco Ardissone (8 September 1837 – 4 April 1910) was an Italian algologist and botanist.

Works 
 Enumerazione delle alghe di Sicilia. F Ardissone, 1864
 Le Floridee Italiche descritte ed illustrate. F Ardissone, 1874
 Enumerazione Delle Alghe Di Liguria. F Ardissone, 1877
 Phycologia mediterranea. F Ardissone, 1883

References

External links 
 

1837 births
1910 deaths
Phycologists
19th-century Italian botanists
20th-century Italian botanists